Lady of the manor is a title of a mediaeval land-holder. 

Lady of the manor may also refer to:
Lady of the Manor (film), a 2021 film
Lady of the Manor (solitaire), a card game variation